Kurt Bilteaux Thomas (March 29, 1956June 5, 2020) was an American Olympic gymnast and part-time actor. In 1978, he became the first American male gymnast to win a gold medal at the World Artistic Gymnastics Championships (world championships). In 1979, he won six medals at the world championship, setting the record for most medals won at a single world championship by an American gymnast, a feat matched only by Simone Biles in 2018. He competed in the 1976 Summer Olympics in Montreal. Thomas was favored to win a medal at the 1980 Summer Olympics but was unable to compete due to the USA boycott of the 1980 Olympic Games.

Early life
Thomas was born in Miami, Florida on March 29, 1956. His father worked as the manager of a meat company and died when Thomas was 7 years old. His mother, Ellie, was a secretary. Thomas considered pursuing professional basketball and football, but his interest in gymnastics was piqued at age 14 after watching the team from Miami-Dade Junior College practice. Thomas was awarded a scholarship to study at Indiana State University (ISU). He was a five-time NCAA champion at ISU, winning the parallel bars and all-around in 1977, and parallel bars, horizontal bar and the all-around in 1979. Thomas led the ISU men's gymnastics team to the 1977 National Championship.

Career
Thomas earned All-America honors 13 times in his career. He was the James E. Sullivan award winner in 1979, as well as the 1979 Nissen Award (the "Heisman" of men's gymnastics) awardee.

Thomas first competed as a member of the U.S. Olympic team at the 1976 Summer Olympics. Two years later, he became the first American male gymnast to win a gold medal in floor exercise, accomplishing the feat in the 1978 World Championships. He subsequently became the first gymnast to receive the James E. Sullivan Award for the best amateur athlete in the United States.  Thomas earned six medals at the 1979 World Championships, including gold on the horizontal bar and floor exercise, and silver in the all-around, parallel bars, and pommel horse, establishing a new American record for most medals won at a single worlds. The feat would later be tied by Simone Biles in 2018. He was seen as a favorite to win a gold medal at the 1980 Summer Olympics in Moscow; however, the games were boycotted by the United States government in protest of the Soviet invasion of Afghanistan.

Since the Olympics' strict amateurism rules at the time would have forced him to forgo many lucrative financial opportunities, Thomas elected not to attempt to compete in the 1984 Summer Olympics. With professionals allowed to compete by the time of the 1992 Summer Olympics, Thomas attempted a comeback. Despite his advanced age for a gymnast, he was able to make it to the 1992 United States Men's Gymnastics Olympic Trials, but his performance there fell short of what was needed to make the team.

Signature moves
Three gymnastic moves were named for him, the Thomas flair, a pommel horse move, and the Thomas salto, his signature skill on floor exercise, a tucked 1.5 backward salto with 1.5 twist into a roll out (a difficult and dangerous skill even by today's standards), and the Thomas on High Bar. The Thomas flair on pommel horse, and then also performed on floor, was developed over years by several pommel horse specialists. However, in gymnastics, new moves are named in the gymnastics rule book after the gymnast who is the first to perform the move in international competition.

Film and television work
Thomas featured in the 1985 film Gymkata, playing the role of an American gymnast who travels to the fictional country of Parmistan in order to compete in a deadly competition called The Game. The film earned Thomas a Razzie Award nomination for Worst New Star and was poorly received by critics, but has developed somewhat of a cult following due to its unintentional comedy. Thomas also starred in the syndicated TV series True Confessions and worked as a commentator for ABC Sports and ESPN.

Personal life
In 1996, Thomas married Rebecca Jones, a dancer who choreographs gymnastic routines. They had two children, Hunter and Kassidy. Thomas had a son from a previous marriage, Kurt Travis. Thomas and his wife ran the Kurt Thomas Gymnastics Training Center in Frisco, Texas. Since 2003, their gym has hosted the annual Kurt Thomas International Invitational gymnastics meet, a competition endorsed by USA Gymnastics.

Thomas was inducted into the International Gymnastics Hall of Fame in 2003. He was inducted into the USA Gymnastics Hall of Fame in 1990, the Indiana State University Athletics Hall of Fame in 1999, and the Missouri Valley Conference Hall of Fame in 2010.

Thomas died on June 5, 2020, at the age of 64. He suffered a stroke on May 24, brought about by a tear of the basilar artery in his brain stem two weeks before his death.

References

External links
 
 
 Kurt Thomas Gymnastics Center
 
 List of competitive results at Gymn Forum
 

1956 births
2020 deaths
Sportspeople from Miami
American male artistic gymnasts
Indiana State University alumni
Gymnasts at the 1976 Summer Olympics
Olympic gymnasts of the United States
James E. Sullivan Award recipients
Originators of elements in artistic gymnastics
World champion gymnasts
Medalists at the World Artistic Gymnastics Championships
Pan American Games silver medalists for the United States
Pan American Games bronze medalists for the United States
Pan American Games medalists in gymnastics
Gymnasts at the 1975 Pan American Games
Medalists at the 1975 Pan American Games